Mario Pašalić (born 9 February 1995) is a Croatian professional footballer who plays as a midfielder for  side Atalanta and the Croatia national team.

He began his career at Hajduk Split before moving to Chelsea for a reported £3 million in 2014. Chelsea loaned him to Elche, Monaco, Milan, Spartak Moscow and then Atalanta. Following two seasons at the Bergamasque club between 2018 and 2020, he was signed permanently ahead of the 2020–21 season.

Pašalić made his senior international debut for Croatia in 2014, representing the side at UEFA Euro 2020 and the 2022 FIFA World Cup.

Club career

Hajduk Split
Pašalić started playing football at county club NK GOŠK Kaštel Gomilica before joining the Hajduk Split's youth academy in 2006. A youth international, he first gained wider recognition in the 2011–12 season, scoring 17 goals for the under-17s, despite being a midfielder, and scoring the winner for the under-19s in a 3–2 success against Hrvatski Dragovoljac, which secured the club's championship trophy.

During the pre-season, however, Pašalić was diagnosed with a staphylococcus infection, being sidelined for the first half of the 2012–13 campaign. He played his first match as a professional on 14 April 2013 replacing Ivan Vuković in the 90th minute of a 2–1 home success against Cibalia.

In summer 2013, Pašalić signed a four-year professional contract with Hajduk and went on to make 36 appearances in all competitions during the 2013–14 season, scoring 11 goals and assisting a further five. On 14 September 2013, he scored two goals in a derby 2–0 victory against Dinamo Zagreb, and repeated the same fate on 8 February the following year, in a 2–1 win at city rivals RNK Split.

Chelsea
On 9 July 2014, Chelsea announced the signing of Pašalić for an undisclosed fee. Upon signing, Pašalić said, "I am very happy because I am now a Chelsea player."

Loan to Elche
On 22 July 2014, Pašalić joined Elche on a season-long loan deal. He made his La Liga debut on 25 August, starting and being booked in a 0–3 away loss against Barcelona. On 12 April 2015, Pašalić scored his first goal in the top flight of Spanish football, netting the last in a 2–0 win over Córdoba. On 29 April 2015, Pašalić scored in a 4–0 victory over Deportivo de La Coruña. On 3 May 2015, he scored a late goal which turned out to be the winner in the match against Málaga in a 2–1 victory.

Loan to Monaco
On 3 July 2015, it was announced that Pašalić will spend the 2015–16 season on loan at Monaco. Striker Radamel Falcao went on loan to Chelsea as part of the loan agreement for Pašalić to join the Monégasque side. During an interview about his loan move to Monaco, Pašalić stated that staying at Chelsea this season was never an option and that he "needs to improve, grow and then hope to get a chance with Chelsea".

On 28 July, Pašalić made his Monaco debut in a 3–1 victory against Swiss side Young Boys in the UEFA Champions League third qualifying round, in which he scored the final goal to make it 3–1. On 8 August, Pašalić made his Ligue 1 debut after playing 25 minutes in a 2–1 win over Nice. On 19 August, Pašalić scored against Valencia, but it was not enough to stop Monaco from losing 3–1 in the first leg of the Champions League play-off. On 17 September, he made his Europa League debut in a 1–1 away draw with Anderlecht. In the 2015–16 Coupe de France, Pašalić scored twice in two appearances.

Loan to Milan

On 27 August 2016, Pašalić joined Serie A side Milan on a season-long loan. A month after the loan was completed, there were reports that stated Milan was looking to cut the loan short and return Pašalić in January. He made his debut off the substitutes' bench on 30 October 2016 in a 1–0 win against Pescara. In the following game, Pašalić made his first start in a 2–1 win over Palermo. Pašalić scored his first goal for Milan in a 2–1 home victory against Crotone.

Pašalić scored the winning penalty in the 2016 Supercoppa Italiana against Juventus, bringing Milan its first major trophy since 2011 after the regular match finished in a 1–1 draw (4–5 penalties). On 8 February 2017, Pašalić scored an 89th-minute winner against Bologna in Milan's 1–0 away win. On 2 April, Pašalić scored the equalizer in Milan's 1–1 away draw with Pescara.

Loan to Spartak Moscow
On 2 August 2017, Pašalić signed a new four-year deal with Chelsea and joined Russian champions Spartak Moscow on loan for the 2017–18 season.

On 12 August, he scored his first goal for Spartak in a 2–1 away defeat to CSKA Moscow. He made his Champions League debut on 13 September in a 1–1 away draw with Maribor. On 27 November, he scored in a 3–1 home victory over Zenit Saint Petersburg. On 10 December, he once again scored in the Main Moscow derby, as Spartak won 3–0 at home.

Atalanta
On 25 July 2018, Pašalić agreed to join Italian side Atalanta on a season-long loan with an option to purchase at the end of the spell. The Italian side finished the season as third in Serie A, qualifying for the next year's Champions League.

On 4 July 2019, Pašalić signed a new contract at Chelsea until 2022 and returned to Atalanta on loan for a second season. On 18 September, Atalanta made their Champions League debut, as Dinamo Zagreb beat them 4–0 at Stadion Maksimir. On 6 November, Pašalić scored the equalizer against Manchester City in a 1–1 draw at San Siro. On 11 December, he scored the second goal in a 3–0 victory over Shakhtar Donetsk at Metalist Stadium. This made Atalanta the first debutant to reach the final 16 of the Champions League since Leicester City in 2016–17, and the first team ever to do it with only seven points. On 2 December 2019, Atalanta negotiated a €15 million option to buy to be activated at the end of the season. On 15 February 2020, he scored the winning goal in a 2–1 victory over Roma, only nineteen seconds after being substituted for Duván Zapata. On 19 February, he provided two assists for Josip Iličić and Hans Hateboer, as Atalanta defeated Valencia 4–1 and went on to reach the Champions League quarter-finals. On 22 June, Mario Pašalić joined Atalanta permanently for €15 million (£13.4 million). On 14 July, he scored his first career hat-trick in a 6–2 victory over Brescia, becoming the fifth Croatian to achieve that in Serie A. On 12 August, in a Champions League quarter-final against Paris Saint-Germain at Estádio da Luz, he scored the only goal for Atalanta before getting substituted off for Luis Muriel; however, PSG managed to overturn the result scoring two goals in injury time and knocking Atalanta out.

In December 2020, Pašalić underwent a sports hernia surgery, which kept him off the pitch for more than two months. He returned to the pitch in a 3–1 defeat to Lazio, in which he scored Atalanta's only goal.

International career
On 14 May 2014, Pašalić was on Croatia manager Niko Kovač's 30-man list that was named to participate in the 2014 World Cup. He was not, however, selected for the final squad. He made his debut for Croatia on 4 September 2014 when he replaced Mario Mandžukić in a friendly home victory over Cyprus.

In May 2018, he was named in Zlatko Dalić's preliminary 32-man squad for the 2018 FIFA World Cup in Russia but did not make the final 23.

He scored his debut goal for the national team on 7 October 2020 in a friendly 2–1 victory over Switzerland.

Personal life
Pašalić was born in Mainz, Germany, but grew up in Kaštel Gomilica, Croatia. His father Ivan is a Bosnian Croat from Sarajlije near Tomislavgrad. His mother Slavica hails from Vrlika. They both moved to Germany due to the Yugoslav War. He is a cousin of fellow footballer Ivan Krstanović.

In June 2019, Pašalić married his longtime girlfriend Marija Grbeša on the island of Čiovo. In February 2022, Pašalić and Grbeša became parents of a baby boy, whom they named Luka.

Career statistics

Club

International

Scores and results list Croatia's goal tally first, score column indicates score after each Pašalić goal.

Honours
Hajduk Split reserves
 Croatian U-19 championship: 2012

Milan
 Supercoppa Italiana: 2016

Atalanta
Coppa Italia runner-up: 2018–19
Croatia

 FIFA World Cup third place: 2022

Individual
Football Oscar: Prva HNL Team of the Year 2014

References

External links

 Profile at the Atalanta B.C. website
 
 
 

1995 births
Living people
German people of Croatian descent
German people of Bosnia and Herzegovina descent
Footballers from Split, Croatia
Croatian footballers
German footballers
Footballers from Rhineland-Palatinate
Association football midfielders
Croatia international footballers
Croatia under-21 international footballers
Croatia youth international footballers
HNK Hajduk Split players
Chelsea F.C. players
Elche CF players
AS Monaco FC players
A.C. Milan players
FC Spartak Moscow players
Atalanta B.C. players
Croatian Football League players
La Liga players
Ligue 1 players
Serie A players
Russian Premier League players
UEFA Euro 2020 players
2022 FIFA World Cup players
Croatian expatriate footballers
Croatian expatriate sportspeople in England
Croatian expatriate sportspeople in Spain
Croatian expatriate sportspeople in Monaco
Croatian expatriate sportspeople in Russia
Croatian expatriate sportspeople in Italy
Expatriate footballers in England
Expatriate footballers in Spain
Expatriate footballers in Monaco
Expatriate footballers in Russia
Expatriate footballers in Italy